The Longyear Drill Site is a historic mineral exploration site in Hoyt Lakes, Minnesota, United States.  In 1890 the first core samples were taken there from what would become known as the Mesabi Range, one of the world's richest iron ore deposits.  The exploration diamond drilling process was led by Edmund J. Longyear, who went on to drill 7,100 test pits all across the Mesabi Range.  In 1976 the Iron Range Historical Society developed the site as a historic attraction with period drilling equipment.  It is now managed by the city of Hoyt Lakes in partnership with the Hoyt Lakes Garden Club.

In 1977 the site was listed as the E.J. Longyear First Diamond Drill Site on the National Register of Historic Places for its state-level significance in the themes of engineering and industry.  It was nominated for its association with the beginning of a mining industry pivotal to the history of Minnesota and the United States.

See also
 National Register of Historic Places listings in St. Louis County, Minnesota

References

External links
 

1890 establishments in Minnesota
Mineral exploration
Mining in Minnesota
Industrial buildings and structures on the National Register of Historic Places in Minnesota
National Register of Historic Places in St. Louis County, Minnesota
Tourist attractions in St. Louis County, Minnesota
Iron mining